Bayi or Chagyib is a subdistrict in Tibet Autonomous Region, China and seat of Bayi District, Nyingchi. It lies on the Nyang River at an altitude of 2,994 metres (9,826 feet). Bayi is an important timber and wool producing town, known historically before the 1960s as Lhabagar.

The new subdistrict completely absorbed the ancient village of Drakchi, which used to stand on this site. The population is now mostly Han Chinese. The Bayi Zanchen bridge crosses the Nyang-chu or Nyang River here.

There are 9 villages under the jurisdiction of the subdistrict, with a total population of 21,400, from the Han, Hui, Mongolian, Xibe, Manchu ethnicities. There has been the extension of two major irrigation channels in the subdistrict to provide for rice farming and the production of other cash crops.

Climate 
Bayi has a subtropical highland climate with monsoonal influences (Köppen Cwb). Precipitation is abundant compared to other areas in Tibet and the area around Bayi is covered with trees.

Footnotes

References
Buckley, Michael and Robert Strauss. (1986). Tibet: A Survival Kit. Lonely Planet, St. Kilda, Victoria, Australia. .
Dorje, Gyume. (1999). Footprint Tibet Handbook with Bhutan. 2nd Edition. Footprint Handbooks, Bath, England. .
Dreams Travel China Guide
www.xza.cn

External links

Official page
 Photos of Bayi at Panoramio
 Bayi Town by the Nyang River
Hudong Encyclopedia 

Populated places in Nyingchi
Township-level divisions of Tibet
Subdistricts of the People's Republic of China